St Mary's School was a private day and boarding girls' school located in Wantage, Oxfordshire, England. In 2007 it merged with Heathfield School to become Heathfield St Mary's School (later reverted to Heathfield) and the Wantage site was closed.

It was affiliated with the Church of England and had close ties with its founding order, the Community of St Mary the Virgin. It was predominantly a boarding school.

History
The Reverend William John Butler became Vicar of Wantage on 1 January 1847. His main aims were, first, to revive the religious life in England and second, to improve education. He hoped to achieve these aims by setting up an order of teaching sisters, but he faced many disappointments and spent 25 years trying to improve various day schools in the parish before St Mary's School was founded in 1873.

Together with its sister school, the School of St Helen and St Katharine in Abingdon, St Mary's was run by the sisters of the Community of St Mary the Virgin and was based in the Queen Anne house on Newbury Street. Sister Ellen was the first Sister-in-Charge and Sister Juliana succeeded her in 1887. Sister Juliana had studied at Cambridge and set a high standard for the girls, entering them for the Oxford and Cambridge local examinations.

Sister Annie Louisa joined the school in 1898 and started a guide movement called Scout Patrols in 1899 before Boy Scouts had even begun. She succeeded Sister Juliana as Headmistress in 1903. Sister Annie Louisa was responsible for the chief structural improvements at St Mary's including a science wing and the conversion of an old barn into a gymnasium. By the time Sister Annie Louisa left in 1919, St Mary's was recognised as a “public school with an unusually high standard of scholarship”.

In 2005 the buildings were purchased for around £15m by the property developer Anton Bilton and his company, Raven Mount. The transaction was said to be necessary to increase the size of the school and modernise facilities. However, in 2006 it was announced that the school would be merging with the Heathfield School in Ascot, to form a new school, Heathfield St Mary's and the Wantage site was closed at the end of the summer term 2007.

Notable alumnae

 Serena Armstrong-Jones, Countess of Snowdon
 Harriet Bridgeman, Viscountess Bridgeman, founder of Bridgeman Art Library
 Lady Moyra Campbell
 Diana Churchill, actress
 Susannah Constantine, fashion advisor and author
 Margaret Cooper (1918-2016), cryptographer
 Flora Fraser, 21st Lady Saltoun
 Hon. Victoria Glendinning, novelist and broadcaster
 Lucinda Green, three-day eventer
 Natalia Grosvenor, Duchess of Westminster
 Hon. Daphne Guinness
 Alexandra Hamilton, Duchess of Abercorn
 Dame Ruth Railton, music director and conductor
 Phyllis Hartnoll, poet
 Kara-Louise Horne, Big Brother 8 contestant
 Davina Ingrams, 18th Baroness Darcy de Knayth
 Judith Keppel, quiz panellist, first million-pound winner of Who wants to be a millionaire?
 Candida Lycett Green, writer
 Tessa Montgomery, Viscountess Montgomery of Alamein
 Emma Nicholson, Baroness Nicholson of Winterbourne, politician
 Lady Henrietta Spencer-Churchill, interior designer
 Lady Helen Taylor
 Susan Travers
 Dame Jane Whiteley
 Judith Wilcox, Baroness Wilcox

References

External links
 School Website (via web.archive.org)
 
 The Merge Forum

Educational institutions established in 1873
Educational institutions disestablished in 2007
Girls' schools in Oxfordshire
Defunct schools in Oxfordshire
1873 establishments in England
2007 disestablishments in England
Defunct Church of England schools
Wantage
People educated at St Mary’s School, Wantage